Roger Duffy is a designer.

Roger Duffy is also the name of:
 Roger Duffy (American football) (born 1967), center and guard
Roger F. Duffy, Pennsylvania politician
Roger Duffy (Australian rules footballer) (born 1931), former Australian rules footballer